The Thrissur Town Hall is an imposing building situated in Thrissur city, Kerala state, India. It was constructed during the Dewanship of RK Shanmughom Chetti and contains the Archaeological Museum and Picture Gallery, where mural paintings from all parts of the Kerala are copied and exhibited. The must see in this museum is the collection of the old manuscripts, written on palm leaves and called olagrandhangal. The Town Hall was built in honour of the then Emperor of India, King George, for his silver jubilee. The architecture is in the Victorian style with a lawn and garden in front.

References

Buildings and structures in Thrissur
City and town halls in India